Toni Tipton-Martin is an African-American food and nutrition journalist and author of several cookbooks, including Jubilee. She serves as the editor-in-chief for Cook's Country. She received the Julia Child Award in 2021, and two James Beard awards.

Biography 
Tipton-Martin worked as a reporter for the Los Angeles Times in the 1980s. She moved to the Cleveland Plain Dealer in 1991, where she was the first Black person to serve as editor of a food section for a large U.S. newspaper. She was named as the editor in chief for Cook's Country in 2020, replacing former editor Tucker Shaw. Her role as editor-in-chief was noted as one of several Black women who were named to top roles for various magazines at the same time.

She moved to Baltimore in 2018 with her husband. She is the mother of four.

Tipton-Martin appeared in the Netflix docuseries High on the Hog.

Books
Tipton-Martin has written several books, including The Jemima Code: Two Centuries of African American Cookbooks (University of Texas Press, 2015) and Jubilee: Recipes from Two Centuries of African-American Cooking (Clarkson Potter, 2019). She self-published The Jemima Code after presenting it to an agent who then disappeared. Both books focus on the cooking of African Americans, and as part of the work involved in writing them, Tipton-Martin researched various historical cookbooks by Black Americans.

In 2005, she published a reprint of an early 20th century cookbook, The Blue Grass Cook Book, by Minnie C. Fox (University Press of Kentucky).

Awards and honors
Tipton-Martin is the winner of two James Beard awards. In 2016, she won the Reference and Scholarship award for The Jemima Code, and Jubilee was awarded Best American Cookbook in 2020. She was the 2021 recipient of the Julia Child Award from the Julia Child Foundation for Gastronomy and the Culinary Arts.

Tipton-Martin is the recipient of the International Association of Culinary Professionals (IACP) Trailblazer Award (2020) and its Book of the Year Award (2020, for Jubilee: Recipes from Two Centuries of African-American Cooking).

See also 

 Bertha L. Turner, she was mentioned in Tipton-Martin's book

References 

American women journalists
Living people
Writers from Baltimore
American cookbook writers
Women cookbook writers
Year of birth missing (living people)
21st-century African-American women writers
21st-century African-American writers
21st-century American women writers
21st-century American non-fiction writers
20th-century American journalists
20th-century American women writers
20th-century American non-fiction writers
Journalists from Maryland
Los Angeles Times people
James Beard Foundation Award winners